Danilo Šerbedžija (born 1971) is a Croatian film director. His debut feature film, 72 Days (2010), was selected as the Croatian entry for the Best Foreign Language Film at the 84th Academy Awards, but it did not make the final shortlist.

Danilo Šerbedžija's father, Rade, and sister, Lucija, are actors.

Filmography
 72 Days (2010)
 The Liberation of Skopje (2016)
 Tereza37 (2020)

References

External links

1971 births
Living people
Croatian film directors
Croatian people of Serbian descent
Film people from Zagreb